The 2014 Idaho Secretary of State election was held on November 4, 2014, to elect the Secretary of State of Idaho. Incumbent Republican Secretary of State Ben Ysursa did not seek re-election after 12 years of serving as the secretary of state.

Background

Republican Incumbent Ben Ysursa decided not to seek re-election after serving since 2003.

Primaries

Republican Primary

Democratic Primary

General Election

County Results

References

2014 Idaho elections
Idaho Secretary of State elections
Idaho
November 2014 events in the United States